Horiguchi (written: 堀口) is a Japanese surname. Notable people with the surname include:

, Japanese professional wrestler
, Japanese poet and translator
, Japanese shogi player
, Japanese mixed martial artist
, Japanese architect and historian
, Japanese animator and illustrator
Yusuke Horiguchi, former Associate Director, IMF

Japanese-language surnames